The 2011 World Championship of Ski Mountaineering were held instead of the originally 9th edition of the European Championships of Ski Mountaineering, why it was the first World Championship in an odd-numbered year, besides the Trofeo Mezzalama in 1975, which was the real first world championship of ski mountaineering. Instead, the 9th edition of the European championships was held in February 2012.

The 2011 World Championship, sanctioned by the International Ski Mountaineering Federation (ISMF) and held in Claut, Italy, lastet from February 19th to 25th, 2011. It was the first edition including a sprint race.

Results

Nation ranking and medals 
(all age groups; without combination ranking medals)

Team race 
event held on February 20, 2011

List of the best 10 relay teams by gender (some teams included "Espoirs" level athletes):

Vertical race 
event held on February 22, 2011

List of the best 10 participants by gender (incl. "Espoirs" level):

Sprint 
event held on February 23, 2011

List of the best 10 participants by gender:

Individual race 
event held on February 24, 2011

List of the best 10 participants by gender:

Relay race 
event held on February 25, 2011

List of the best 10 relay teams by gender (some teams included "Espoirs" level athletes):

Combination ranking 
(vertical race, individual and team ranking)

List of the best 10 participants by gender:

References

External links 
 Rankings - World Championship 2011 - Claut / Italia, ISMF

2011
World Championships of Ski Mountaineering
Skiing competitions in Italy
International sports competitions hosted by Italy
World Championships of Ski Mountaineering
Province of Pordenone